Nathan Kerr (born 20 January 1998) is a semi-professional footballer who plays as a full-back for NIFL Championship side Annagh United. He has been capped by Northern Ireland up to under-19 level.

Career
Kerr came through the youth team at Stevenage to sign his first professional contract in May 2016. Manager Darren Sarll had originally taken Kerr to the club's academy after seeing him captain Northern Ireland schoolboys to victory over England in the Victory Shield. He made his first team debut as a 77th-minute substitute for Ronnie Henry in a 3–1 defeat to Leyton Orient in an EFL Trophy group stage game at Brisbane Road on 30 August 2016. He made his League Two debut four days later, again replacing Henry, as Stevenage beat Hartlepool United 6–1 at Broadhall Way.

Career statistics

References

1998 births
Living people
Association footballers from Northern Ireland
Northern Ireland youth international footballers
Association football fullbacks
Association football midfielders
Stevenage F.C. players
English Football League players
Portadown F.C. players
Glentoran F.C. players